Horatio Clare (born 1973) is an English author known for travel, memoir, nature and children's books. He worked at the BBC as a producer on Front Row (BBC Radio 4), Night Waves and The Verb (BBC Radio 3).

Clare has written memoirs such as Running for the Hills and Truant: Notes from the Slippery Slope, a novella, The Prince's Pen, and numerous works of travel and nature writing: these include A Single Swallow (2009) and Down to the Sea in Ships (2014).

He wrote and edited Sicily Through Writers' Eyes in 2006. In 2015 he published Orison for A Curlew, a combination of travel and nature writing, and in the winter of 2017 Chatto and Windus published Icebreaker – A Voyage Far North, the record of a journey around the Bay of Bothnia with the Finnish government's Icebreaker 'Otso'.

His 2019 work The Light in the Dark: a winter journal is an exploration of the highs and lows of the British winter. Heavy Light: a Journey Through Madness, Mania and Healing appeared in 2021, published by Chatto & Windus. The work describes Clare's own breakdown, sectioning, psychiatric treatment, and recovery.

Two children's books, Aubrey and the Terrible Yoot and a sequel Aubrey and the Terrible Ladybirds appeared in 2015 and 2017. Both Aubrey books were longlisted for the Carnegie Medal.

Background and career
Born in London, Clare grew up on a hill farm in the Black Mountains of South Wales. He later attended Malvern College and the United World College of the Atlantic before reading English at the University of York.

Clare describes the experiences of his childhood in his first book, the best-seller Running for the Hills. His second book, Truant: Notes from the Slippery Slope was published in 2008. In 2009 Clare's third book, A Single Swallow: Following an epic journey from South Africa to South Wales", was published. In 2014 Chatto and Windus published Down to the Sea in Ships: Of Ageless Oceans and Modern Men, the best-selling story of two voyages on container vessels Clare joined.

In 2015 his first children's book, Aubrey and the Terrible Yoot, was published by Firefly, and an account of the disappearance of the slender-billed curlew, Orison for a Curlew was published by Little Toller Books. In 2017 "Aubrey and the Terrible Ladybirds" was published by Firefly. A collection of retellings of Welsh legends, "Myths and Legends of the Brecon Beacons", was published by Graffeg.

Clare is the author and editor of Sicily Through Writers' Eyes, an anthology of writings about Sicily, and a contributor to the collections Red City: Marrakech Through Writers' Eyes and Meetings With Remarkable Muslims. His journalism has appeared in The Guardian, The Sunday Times, The Spectator, New Statesman, Financial Times, The Sunday Telegraph, The Daily Telegraph, "The Observer"and Vogue.

His 2021 book Heavy Light describes his breakdown, sectioning, psychiatric treatment, and recovery.

Awards and honours
2007 Somerset Maugham Award winner for Running for the Hills
2007 Sunday Times Young Writer of the Year Award shortlist for Running for the Hills
2010 Dolman Best Travel Book Award shortlisted for A Single Swallow
2010 Foreign Press Association Awards Winner: Travel Feature 2010 "Rock of Ages – Ethiopian Highlands"
2015 Wales Book of the Year Shortlisted for Down to the Sea in Ships
2015 Stanford Dolman Travel Book of the Year winner for Down to the Sea in Ships
2016 Branford Boase Award Winner, Debut Children's Book of the Year, Aubrey and the Terrible Yoot.
2016 Carnegie Medal, Longlist, for Aubrey and the Terrible Yoot
2017 Carnegie Medal, Longlist for Aubrey and the Terrible Ladybirds
2018 Wales Book of the Year, Shortlisted for Icebreaker: A Voyage Far North
2018 Grand Prix des Lecteurs Le Journal de Mickey, Shortlisted for Aubrey and the Terrible Yoot

Publications
 Marrakech the Red City: the City through Writers' Eyes, Sickle Moon / Eland, 2003
 Meetings With Remarkable Muslims, Eland 2005
 Sicily: Through Writers' Eye, Eland, 2006
 Running for the Hills, John Murray, 2006
 Truant: Notes from A Slippery Slope, John Murrary, 2007
 A Single Swallow, Chatto and Windus (UK) and Nieuw Amsterdam (Netherlands), 2009
 The Prince's Pen, Seren Books 2011, New Tales from the Mabinogion series
 Down to the Sea in Ships, Chatto and Windus 2014
 The Paratrooper's Princess Accent Press / Quickreads 2015
 Orison for a Curlew, Little Toller Books 2015.
 Aubrey and the Terrible Yoot Firefly 2015
 Aubrey and the Terrible Ladybirds Firefly 2017
 Myths and Legends of the Brecon Beacons Graffeg 2017
 Icebreaker – A Voyage Far North Chatto and Windus 2017
Something of His Art: Walking to Lübeck with J.S. Bach Little Toller 2018
The Light in the Dark: A Winter Journal Elliott & Thompson Limited 2019
Heavy Light: a Journey Through Madness, Mania and Healing Chatto & Windus 2021

References

External links
 Website 
 Horatio Clare's thoughtful memoir, Running for the Hills, is an account of his childhood on a Welsh sheep farm. Daniel Butler. The Guardian. Saturday 25 March 2006. Retrieved 8 July 2010.
 Running for the Hills by Horatio Clare. Alyson Rudd. The Times. 28 April 2007. Retrieved 8 July 2010.
Bach Walks, BBC Radio 3, broadcast December 2017. Retrieved 1 November 2020.

Living people
1973 births
BBC people
British male journalists
People educated at Malvern College
Alumni of the University of York
People educated at Atlantic College